disambiguation: for the pro wrestler's dad see James Henry Bowles

James Bowles (born 1985 in Newtownshandrum, County Cork) is an Irish sportsperson.   He plays hurling with his local club Newtownshandrum and was a substitute on the Cork senior inter-county team in the early 2000s.

References

1985 births
Living people
Newtownshandrum hurlers
Cork inter-county hurlers